Bonnett is a surname. Notable people with the surname include:

Robert Bonnett (1916–1994), member of the Australian House of Representatives
Neil Bonnett (1946–1994), NASCAR driver who ranks 35th in all time NASCAR Cup wins
Piedad Bonnett (born 1951), Colombian poet, playwright and novelist
Mauricio Bonnett (born 1961), Colombian novelist and film director

See also
Bonnett's Energy, an oil and gas investment trust
Bonnet (disambiguation)